Viñales Valley is a karstic depression in Cuba. In 1999, the valley was inscribed on the UNESCO World Heritage List as a cultural landscape because of its use of traditional tobacco-growing techniques.

Overview

Tobacco and other crops are cultivated on the bottom of the valley, mostly by traditional agriculture techniques that have been in use for several centuries. These techniques allegedly make for higher-quality tobacco than if mechanical methods are used. The valley is dotted with small farms and villages which have been occupied since the time of the 'conquistadores', maintaining some vernacular colonial-era architecture. The culture of the valley was likewise influenced by a mixture of cultures: indigenous peoples, African slaves, and the Spanish colonizers.  

Many caves dot the surrounding hillfaces, including Cueva del Indio and Cueva de José Miguel. The conspicuous limestone mounds rising like islands from the bottom of the valley are called mogotes. They can be up to 300 m tall.

Viñales is a major tourist destination offering mainly hiking and rock climbing. The local climbing scene has started to take off in the last few years with many new routes being discovered resulting in an increase in local tourism.

Geography
The extraordinary geomorphological formations known as mogotes, which are found nowhere else in Cuba, have sometimes not only attained the dimensions of mountains, but have also taken on a variety of unusual shapes. The only comparable geological structures in the world are those to be found in the Malay Peninsula, Borneo, the Thai highlands, Laos, Vietnam, and in the South China Karst region, all of them are situated in Asia.

In the valley, there are other elevations, such as Alturas de Pizarras, which are formed from a variety of rocks, the oldest existing throughout the country and also in the Caribbean area.

Conservation
Many endemic plants and animals are specific to this valley.  Flora found in the region include  (syn. Bombax emarginatum), mountain palm (Gaussia princeps), Ekmanianthe actinophylla, and Microcycas calocoma.  Fauna includes bee hummingbird (Mellisuga helenae, zunzún), Cuban trogon (Priotelus temnurus), Cuban tody (Todus multicolor), Cuban solitaire (Myadestes elisabeth) and Cuban grassquit (Tiaris canorus).

Mural of Prehistory

In the valley of Dos Hermanas, we can find the Mural of Prehistory, which is painted on a stone of one of the elevations. This mural shows the evolution of life in a natural sense of Cuba.

The Mural of Prehistory is located in the mogote called Pita. It can be found on a perpendicular slope. The rock was washed and drains were also made in it to avoid erosion in the future due to the rain. It is 120 meters high and 160 meters in length. The artist was Leovigildo González Morillo, who was Director of Cartography of the Academy of Sciences of Cuba.

In it are represented Guanahatabeyes Indians, species of mammals, gigantic animals, as well as some mollusks.

In the Mural can be seen in 12 pieces the evolutionary process of men and animals in the Sierra de los Organs, in its different stages.

Photo gallery

References

External links

 
 UNESCO Viñales Valley webpage
 Main website for rock climbing in Cuba, especially Vinales.
 

Geography of Pinar del Río Province
Landforms of Cuba
National parks of Cuba
World Heritage Sites in Cuba
Tourist attractions in Pinar del Río Province